Hannu Mäkelä is the name of

 Hannu Mäkelä (writer) (born 1943), Finnish writer 
 Hannu Mäkelä (athlete) (born 1949), Finnish sprinter